The Ju-Jitsu competition at the 2009 Asian Martial Arts Games took place from August 4 to August 6 at the Thai-Japan Youth Center.

Medalists

Duo

Fighting

Medal table

Results

Duo

Women
4 August

Mixed
4 August

Fighting

Men's 69 kg
5 August

Men's 77 kg
5 August

Round 1

Round robin

Men's 85 kg
6 August

Round 1

Round robin

 Murtadha Kamal of Iraq tied with Elyorbek Akbarov in score but defeated 7–5 the latter in final to seize the gold medal.

Women's 55 kg
5 August

Women's 62 kg
6 August

References
 Official website – Jujitsu

2009 Asian Martial Arts Games events
2009